Monika Scheftschik (born 3 September 1953) is a German luger. She competed in the women's singles event at the 1976 Winter Olympics.

References

External links
 

1953 births
Living people
German female lugers
Olympic lugers of West Germany
Lugers at the 1976 Winter Olympics
People from Passau
Sportspeople from Lower Bavaria